Newton Lower Falls, Massachusetts is one of the thirteen villages within the city of Newton in Middlesex County, Massachusetts, United States. The commercial area extends across the river into Wellesley, Massachusetts, where it is known as Wellesley Lower Falls, where a majority of the retail businesses are.

The Charles River drops 18 feet over less than a quarter-mile at Lower Falls. A series of three small dams with fish ladders are located along the drop.
The primary roads through the village of Lower Falls are Grove Street, Washington Street (Route 16), and Concord Street. The area is now a suburban neighborhood centered on the park at the old Hamilton elementary school (now Lower Falls Community Center), and bordered on the northwest by the Charles River and the Leo J. Martin public golf course. The historic heart of the Lower Falls village, St. Mary's Episcopal Church, and the adjacent residential area on Grove Street, are listed on the National Register of Historic Places as the Newton Lower Falls Historic District.

Notable people
 Thomas Wilmer Dewing, a famous painter, 1851–1938
 Sarah Fuller, educator and author who taught Helen Keller
 Arthur T. Gregorian, Oriental rug merchant
 Walter Montgomery Jackson (1863–1923), founder of encyclopedia publisher Grolier
 Kay Khan, Massachusetts state representative

See also
National Register of Historic Places listings in Newton, Massachusetts

References

External links
 Arthur T. Gregorian, Inc., website
 Newton Lower Falls
 Newton Lower Falls walking tour

Villages in Newton, Massachusetts
Villages in Massachusetts